Igor Kordej (referred to as Igor Kordey in American and French publications; born 23 June 1957) is a Croatian comic book artist, illustrator, graphic designer and scenographer of international reputation.

Early life
Igor Kordej graduated at ŠPUD (The School of Applied Arts and Design in Zagreb), graphic department (1972-1977) and attended two years at Academy of Fine Arts, University of Zagreb, graphic department (1977-1979).

Career

Novi kvadrat 
Igor Kordej started as a professional graphic designer when he was 18, and as a professional comic artist and illustrator when he was 19 years old, joining a very influential group of comic artists Novi kvadrat (New square) 1976–1979, and publishing in all relevant Yugoslavian youth magazines of that era. In 1979 Novi kvadrat won the prestigious national award 7 sekretara SKOJ-a, thus marking a break-up of the group.

SLS studio 
In the early 1980s, Kordej teamed up with Mirko Ilić again in SLS studio (acronym for "Slow, Bad and Expensive"), and focuses on producing album covers and posters for Yugoslavian pop musicians and groups. After the break-up with Ilić he continues with solo career, doing illustration for Yugoslavian mainstream magazines, film and theater posters, logotypes and album covers.

Early international work 
Kordej started a career in European comic market in 1986 (France, Spain, Germany), and since 1989 on the US market (Heavy Metal Magazine). His most significant work from that period is album Les cinq saisons – Automne, published in 1990 by Dargaud. That album was appointed by the Ministry of Culture in France as a work of significant cultural value and was assigned to all public libraries in France (in 2011 the same album was featured in Paul Gravett's book 1001 Comics You Must Read Before You Die).

Kordej moved from Zagreb to a small Istrian village, Groznjan in 1988 where he leads, as an artist and supervisor, a group of over 20 artists and story writers (among others a young Darko Macan, Edvin Biuković and Goran Sudžuka), as well as veterans Radovan Devlić and Dragan Filipović Fipa, producing comics and design for the German market.

In 1991 he moved to Denmark at the invitation of Semic International company, where he spends almost a year, producing comics and illustrations for Malibu Comics. In 1997 he moves to Canada, invited by Digital Chameleon company, working as a creative director. Having disputes with management, he leaves the company after eight months and becomes a freelancer again.

Marvel 
From 1994 to 1996, Kordej did work for both Marvel Comics and Dark Horse Comics. At Marvel, he worked under editor-in-chief Marcus McLaurin, when Kordej produced several hand-painted comics for Tales of Marvels series. He returned to Marvel in 2001 when he was invited by editor-in–chief Joe Quesada to work on the series Cable and New X-Men. Shortly after the 9/11 attacks many of Marvel artists produced illustrations inspired by the tragedy. They all went on public auction, with the profits donated to families of fallen rescuers. Kordey's illustration Pennsylvania Plane was bought by The Library of Congress. Because of his speed as an artist, at his peak, Kordej was producing artwork for three or four monthly books at the same time. However, as a result, he has attracted heavy criticism for the quality of his art, especially from the readers.

Delcourt 
A few months later Kordej signed a contract with Editions Delcourt. In a period of fifteen years, he produced 4-5 albums per year. He ended his tenure with the publisher in 2019, having published nearly seventy albums on the francophone market.

Awards and nominations
1986 Best comic (Zvjezdana prašina), Mladost magazine, Belgrade, Yugoslavia 
1987 Best comic, SFERA Award, Zagreb, Yugoslavia
1995 Best illustration, SFERA Award, Zagreb, Croatia
1996 Best color illustration, SFERA Award, Zagreb, Croatia
2000 Best artist, voted by fans, Haxtur Award (Batman/Tarzan – The Claws of the Catwoman), Gijón, Spain
2005 Best artist, Haxtur Award (X-treme X-Men – Storm: The Arena), Gijón, Spain
2006 Best limited series, Eisner and Harvey awards nominations (Smoke), USA and Canada
2007 Best artist, voted by fans, Reims, France
2009 Award for contribution to the comics industry, FraMaFu festival, Virovitica, Croatia
2009 Best cover, Glyph Award (Unknown soldier series), Philadelphia, SAD
2010 Favourite European comic book, Eagle Award nomination (The Secret History), Bristol, England
2010 Voted by fans (Persona mas nocturna), Avilés, Spain
2011 Best theatre scenography (Čudo u Poskokovoj dragi) with Valentina Crnković, Marulo Award, 21st Festival "Marulić Days", Split, Croatia
2013 Chevalier of Order of Arts and Letters, Ministry of Culture, France
2013 Honorary member of ULUPUH (Croatian Association of Artists of Applied Arts), Zagreb, Croatia
2020 Gold medal - best of show - Rastko Ćirić for The Rubber Soul Project box set, Global Music Awards, La Jolla, California, USA. Kordey participated as designer and executive producer.
2022 Best artist, European Science Fiction Society, Dudelange, Luxembourg

Bibliography

Interior work
La Saga de Vam Volume 1-3 (with Vladimir Colin, Les Humanoïdes Associés, 1988–1989)
Heavy Metal Volume 13 #5: "The Wall" (with Mikalacki, anthology, HM Communications, 1989)
Les Cinq Saisons: L'Automne (with Django Nenad, one-shot, Les Humanoïdes Associés, 1990)
Tales of the Marvels: Wonder Years #1-2 (with Dan Abnett and Andy Lanning, Marvel, 1995)
Edgar Rice Burroughs' Tarzan (Dark Horse):
A Tale of Mugambi (with Darko Macan, one-shot, 1995)
Tarzan/Carson of Venus #1-4 (with Darko Macan, 1998)
The Rivers of Blood #1-4 (script and art, with Neven Antičević, 1999–2000)
Batman/Tarzan: Claws of the Cat-woman #1-4 (with Ron Marz, 1999–2000)
A Decade of Dark Horse #1: "Predator: 1718" (with Henry Gilroy, Dark Horse, 1996)
Aliens: Havoc #1 (with Mark Schultz, among other artists, Dark Horse, 1997)
Myst #1 (of 4) (colours on Doug Wheatley, written by Chris Ulm and Lovern Kindzierski, Dark Horse, 1997)
Star Wars (Dark Horse): 
The Protocol Offensive (with Brian Daley, Anthony Daniels and Ryder Windham, graphic novel, 1997)
Star Wars Tales #1: "Mara Jade: A Night on the Town" (with Timothy Zahn, anthology, 1999)
Chewbacca #1 (of 4) (with Darko Macan and Brent Eric Anderson, 2000)
Conspiracy #1-2 (with Dan Abnett and Andy Lanning, Marvel, 1998)
The Incredible Hulk #461: "Self Destruction" (colours on David Brewer, written by Peter David, Marvel, 1998)
Star Trek: Next Generation — The Gorn Crisis (with Kevin J. Anderson and Rebecca Moesta, graphic novel, Wildstorm, 2001)
The Brotherhood #3: "Drunk with Powers That Could Destroy the World" (among other artists — inks on Esad Ribić, written by X, Marvel, 2001)
Cable #97-105, 107 (with David Tischman (#97-104) and Darko Macan (#105 and 107), Marvel, 2001–2002)
New X-Men #119-120, 124–125, 128-130 (with Grant Morrison, Marvel, 2001–2002)
Captain America vol. 3 #50: "Relics" (with Brian David-Marshall, co-feature, Marvel, 2002)
A Moment of Silence: "Sick Day" (with Joe Quesada, anthology one-shot, Marvel, 2002)
Diosamante #2  (with Alejandro Jodorowsky and Franck Reichert, Les Humanoïdes Associés, 2002)
Black Widow: Pale Little Spider #1-3 (with Greg Rucka, Marvel MAX, 2002)
Soldier X #1-8 (with Darko Macan, Marvel, 2002–2003)
X-Treme X-Men #25-46 (with Chris Claremont, Marvel, 2003–2004)
Smoke #1-3 (with Alex de Campi, IDW Publishing, 2005)
L'Histoire secrète Volume 1–2, 6-34, 0, 35 (with Jean-Pierre Pécau, Delcourt, 2005–2019)
Empire Volume 1-4 (with Jean-Pierre Pécau, Delcourt, 2006–2016)
Le cœur des batailles Volume 1-2 (with Jean-David Morvan, Delcourt, 2007–2008)
Taras Boulba Volume 1-2 (with Jean-David Morvan, Delcourt, 2008)
L'idole et le fléau Volume 1-2 (with L. F. Bollée, 12 bis, 2009–2010)
Keltos Volume 1-2 (with Jean-Pierre Pécau, Delcourt, 2009–2010)
Scalped #50: "The Art of Surviving" (with Jason Aaron, among other artists, Vertigo, 2011)
Jour J Volume 12, 15, 24, 29-31 (with Jean-Pierre Pécau, Fred Blanchard and Fred Duval, Delcourt, 2013–2017)
Les 30 Deniers Volume 1-5 (with Jean-Pierre Pécau, Delcourt, 2014–2016)
Nous, les morts Volume 1-4 (with Darko Macan, Delcourt, 2015)
Marshal Bass #1-8 (with Darko Macan, Delcourt, 2017–2022)
Colt & Pepper #1-2 (with Darko Macan, Delcourt, 2020-2021)
Mobius #1-3 (with Jean-Pierre Pécau, Delcourt, 2021-2022)

Covers only
The Real Adventures of Jonny Quest #3 (Dark Horse, 1996)
Predator: Kindred #1-4 (Dark Horse, 1996–1997)
Predator vs. Judge Dredd #3 (Dark Horse, 1997)
Classic Star Wars: Han Solo at Stars' End #1 (Dark Horse, 1997)
Star Wars: Tales of the Jedi — Redemption #1-5 (Dark Horse, 1998)
Star Wars Special #1 (Dark Horse, 1998)
Soldier X #9-10 (Marvel, 2003)
Angel: The Curse #1, 3 (IDW Publishing, 2005)
Hrvatski Velikani Volume 1 #1, 3 (Astoria, 2007)
Unknown Soldier vol. 4 #1-6 (Vertigo, 2008–2009)
Detective Comics #1018 (DC Comics, 2020)
Basketful of Heads #6, variant cover (DC Comics, 2020)
20th Century Men #1, variant cover (Image, 2022)

References

External links

Interviews
SMOKE Interview with Alex & Igor, PopImage
Veliki Brat valja se od smijeha 

1957 births
Artists from Zagreb
Living people
Croatian comics artists
Croatian comics writers
Croatian illustrators